Tompkins Street–Main Street Historic District, formerly known as Tompkins Street Historic District, is a historic district in Cortland, New York.  It encompasses 109 contributing buildings and one contributing site in the central business district of Cortland and the surrounding residential areas.  It includes about 60 commercial buildings built between 1860 and 1910, public buildings such as the separately listed U.S. Post Office, and the Cortland Rural Cemetery.  Residences date as early as the 1830s and include mansions from the 1890-1916 period.  Most residences are  stories and of frame construction.

Under the Tompkins Street name, it was listed on the National Register of Historic Places in 1975.  Its boundaries were increased to include Main Street from Tompkins to Clinton Streets in 1982.

References

Historic districts on the National Register of Historic Places in New York (state)
Historic districts in Cortland County, New York
National Register of Historic Places in Cortland County, New York